Alternaria is a genus of Deuteromycetes fungi. All species are known as major plant pathogens. They are also common allergens in humans, growing indoors and causing hay fever or hypersensitivity reactions that sometimes lead to asthma. They are present in the human mycobiome and readily cause opportunistic infections in immunocompromised people such as AIDS patients.

There are 299 species in the genus; they are ubiquitous in the environment and are a natural part of fungal flora almost everywhere. They are normal agents of decay and decomposition. The spores are airborne and found in the soil and water, as well as indoors and on objects. The club-shaped spores are single or form long chains. They can grow thick colonies which are usually green, black, or gray.

At least 20% of agricultural spoilage is caused by Alternaria species, with the most severe losses reaching 80% of yield. Many human health disorders can be caused by these fungi, which grow on skin and mucous membranes, including on the eyeballs and within the respiratory tract. Allergies are common, but serious infections are rare, except in people with compromised immune systems. However, species of this fungal genus are often prolific producers of a variety of toxic compounds. The effects most of these compounds have on animal and plant health are not well known. Many species of alternaria modify their secondary metabolites by sulfoconjugation; however, the role of this process is not yet understood. The terms alternariosis and alternariatoxicosis are used for disorders in humans and animals caused by a fungus in this genus.

Not all Alternaria species are pests and pathogens; some have shown promise as biocontrol agents against invasive plant species. Some species have also been reported as endophytic microorganisms with highly bioactive metabolites.

The genus is now known to be polyphyletic.

Species

Some species include:
Alternaria alternata – Causes early blight of potato, Leaf spot disease in Withania somnifera and can infest many other plants. It also causes upper respiratory infections in AIDS patients, asthma in people with sensitivity, and has been implicated in chronic rhinosinusitis.
Alternaria alternantherae
Alternaria arborescens – causes stem canker of tomato
Alternaria arbusti – causes leaf lesions on Asian pear
Alternaria blumeae – causes lesions on Blumea aurita
Alternaria brassicae – infests many vegetables and roses
Alternaria brassicicola – grows on cole crops
Alternaria burnsii – causing cumin blossom blight
Alternaria carotiincultae – causes leaf blight on carrot
Alternaria carthami
Alternaria celosiae
Alternaria cinerariae
Alternaria citri – causes black rot on citrus plants
Alternaria conjuncta – grows on parsnip
Alternaria cucumerina – grows on various cucurbits
Alternaria dauci – grows on carrot
Alternaria dianthi
Alternaria dianthicola
Alternaria eichhorniae – infests water hyacinth plants, used as bioherbicide against these weeds
Alternaria euphorbiicola – infests cole crops
Alternaria eureka
Alternaria gaisen – causes ringspot disease of pear
Alternaria helianthi
Alternaria helianthicola
Alternaria hungarica
Alternaria infectoria – infests wheat
Alternaria japonica – infests cole crops
Alternaria limicola – earliest diverging lineage of Section Porri
Alternaria linicola
Alternaria longipes – infects tobacco
Alternaria mali
Alternaria molesta – may cause skin lesions on porpoises
Alternaria panax – causes ginseng blight
Alternaria perpunctulata
Alternaria petroselini – causes parsley leaf blight
Alternaria porri
Alternaria quercicola
Alternaria radicina – causes carrot decay
Alternaria raphani
Alternaria saponariae
Alternaria selini – causes parsley crown decay
Alternaria senecionis
Alternaria solani – causes early blight in potatoes and tomatoes
Alternaria smyrnii – infests alexanders and parsleys
Alternaria tenuissima
Alternaria triticina
Alternaria ventricosa
Alternaria zinniae

References

Other sources

External links 

 Alternaria as an indoor fungal allergen
 Alternaria Online (login required) 
 IPM for Alternaria leafspot
 Photo gallery
 Mycology Online page
 Fungal Hypersensitivity

 
Dothideomycetes genera

Fungal plant pathogens and diseases